The London Borough of Havering is a London borough in northeast London, England. Part of Outer London, much of its area is protected from development by the Metropolitan Green Belt and more than half the borough is now parkland. Its parks and open spaces range from the large urban park to village greens and there are more than a hundred of them in total, mostly in the care of Havering London Borough Council (which are patrolled by Havering Parks Constabulary), but some by other organisations. Part of the extensive community forest known as Thames Chase is also within the borough, and a large new regional parkland is currently under development, called Wildspace. There are 93 Sites of Importance for Nature Conservation in Havering. Other parks and open spaces are:

References

External links
Havering London Borough Council: Parks and Open Spaces A - G
Havering London Borough Council: Parks and Open Spaces H - Q
Havering London Borough Council: Parks and Open Spaces R - Z